Pema Dorji may refer to:

 Pema Dorji (doctor) (1936–2009), first person to institutionalize traditional medicine in Bhutan
 Pema Dorji (footballer) b. 1985, Bhutanese football manager

See also
 Dorji